Baldwin Park may refer to:

 Baldwin Park, California
Baldwin Park (Metrolink station) in Baldwin Park, California
 Baldwin Park, Florida, a neighborhood in Orlando, Florida
 Baldwin Park, Missouri
 A public park in Baldwin, Nassau County, New York